Gonodonta is a genus of moths in the family Erebidae. The genus was erected by Jacob Hübner in 1818.

Species

 Gonodonta aequalis Walker, 1857
 Gonodonta aeratilinea Todd, 1973
 Gonodonta amianta Hampson, 1924
 Gonodonta biarmata Guenée, 1852
 Gonodonta bidens Geyer, 1832
 Gonodonta chorinea Cramer, 1782
 Gonodonta clotilda Stoll, 1790
 Gonodonta correcta Walker, 1857
 Gonodonta distincta Todd, 1959
 Gonodonta ditissima Walker, 1858
 Gonodonta fernandezi Todd, 1959
 Gonodonta fulvangula Geyer, 1832
 Gonodonta fulvidens Felder & Rogenhofer, 1874
 Gonodonta holosericea Guenée, 1852
 Gonodonta immacula Guenée, 1852
 Gonodonta incurva Sepp, 1840
 Gonodonta indentata Hampson, 1926
 Gonodonta latimacula Guenée, 1852
 Gonodonta lecha Schaus, 1911
 Gonodonta lincus Cramer, 1775
 Gonodonta maria Guenée, 1852
 Gonodonta mexicana Schaus, 1901
 Gonodonta nitidimacula Guenée, 1852
 Gonodonta nutrix Cramer, 1780 – citrus fruit-piercer moth
 Gonodonta obsesa Walker, 1864
 Gonodonta paraequalis Todd, 1959
 Gonodonta parens Guenée, 1852
 Gonodonta primulina Druce, 1887
 Gonodonta pseudamianta Todd, 1959
 Gonodonta pulverea Schaus, 1911
 Gonodonta pyrgo Cramer, 1777
 Gonodonta separans Walker, 1857
 Gonodonta sicheas Cramer, 1777
 Gonodonta sinaldus Guenée, 1852
 Gonodonta sitia Schaus, 1911
 Gonodonta soror Cramer, 1780
 Gonodonta sphenostigma Todd, 1973
 Gonodonta syrna Guenée, 1852
 Gonodonta unica Neumoegen, 1891
 Gonodonta uxor Cramer, 1780
 Gonodonta walkeri Todd, 1959

References

 
Calpinae
Moth genera